Callindra is a genus of tiger moths in the family Erebidae described by Röber in 1925. It consists of a number of South and East Asian species, reviewed by Vladimir Viktorovitch Dubatolov and Yasunori Kishida (2006), with the type species, Callindra arginalis.

Species 
Callindra arginalis (Hampson, 1894)
Callindra equitalis (Kollar, [1844])
Callindra lenzeni (Daniel, 1943)
Callindra nepos (Leech, 1899)
Callindra nyctemerata (Moore, 1879
Callindra principalis (Kollar, [1844])
Callindra similis (Moore, 1879

References

Dubatolov, V. V. & Kishida, Y. (2006). "On the re-arrangement of the East Asian Callimorpha species (Lepidoptera, Arctiidae". Tinea. 19 (2): 111–125.

External links

Callimorphina
Moth genera